Reported Missing is a British documentary television series broadcast on BBC One (2017–present). The series follows various police departments and associated organisations in the United Kingdom, in search for missing people. Each episode follow one or more cases, from the first 999 call through to the conclusion. The first series was narrated by Ruth Wilson and the second and third series are narrated by Indira Varma. Reported Missing has eleven episodes over three series. Series 1 had three episodes, series 2 had four episodes and series 3 had five episodes, but the last episode was not aired.

Episodes

Series 1 (2017)

Series 2 (2018)

Series 3 (2020)

Unaired Series 3 Finale 
The fifth and finale episode of series 3 was due to air on 9 September 2020 at 9pm on BBC One. However, a repeat of episode 2 from series 1 aired. The production company of Reported Missing told Gloucestershire Live that the change was due to legal reasons: “The run was originally planned to be five new programmes, the majority of which featured Gloucestershire Constabulary, but for legal reasons, a repeat is now going in on the fifth and final week”.

References

External links 
 
 

2017 British television series debuts
2010s British documentary television series
2020s British documentary television series
BBC television documentaries
BBC high definition shows
English-language television shows